ATC Colombia (Aero Transcolombiana de Carga Ltda) was an airline created in early 1992 with Colombian partners, from the United States and also Venezuela. Operating with Douglas DC-8 airplanes, it became the second Colombian cargo company. It ceased its entire operations in 1999.

History
ATC began work to operate between Miami and several points in Colombia with their own Douglas DC-8-51F (HK-3816-X) with a capacity for 35 tons of cargo and it was acquired from Agro Air. Also, to satisfy their consumer demand, additional planes were occasionally leased to the Fine Air company localized in Miami. Its main partner in Colombia was a man named Miguel Canal. At the end of 1995, under the presidency of Carlos Child, a second Douglas DC-8-51F (N507DC) was brought in and the rental system of additional aircraft to Fine Air company was continued, including the Douglas DC-8-61F, which were larger and therefore they could transport more cargo. Meanwhile, Fine Air company, which had shares in ATC, tried several times to obtain a license to fly to Colombia, which the American government always denied. That same year Miguel Canal, who ran the company for two years, retired from direct management of the company.

In 1996 ATC made a special operation to become the number one company in the management of export flowers and the mobilization of this product between Bogotá and Miami. ATC inaugurated in September in the same year new facilities at the El Dorado Airport in Bogotá. In February 1997, when Colombian-American relations were going through their worst moment because of the scandal of the government of President Samper and the de-categorization of Civil Aviation, ATC was recertified by the Civil Aviation and the FAA of the United States. In this way, the company became the second Colombian freight transporter after Tampa Cargo. In the same year a Douglas DC-8-51F (N508DC) was temporarily leased. ATC had 30 of its own crew, including pilots, co-pilots and flight engineers. The company's personnel plant in 1998 was 120 employees, counting those from Colombia and abroad. In 1999 ATC reached an agreement with the Cargolux company in Luxembourg, to operate direct flights to Europe, especially to transport flowers. In February 1999, a weekly frequency from Bogotá to Luxembourg was included using the Boeing 747-400 freighters. This cargo transport alliance is similar to a code-share agreement in the case of passenger flights, the transport of ATC cargo on CARGOLUX airplanes using ATC air guides. This arrangement was similar to what LAC, Caribbean Airlines reached to have with the same company some years before.

By 1999, the problems of noise levels in the Douglas DC-8 turbines began, ATC sought to convert the engines to Stage 3 or replace the flight equipment. Fine Air company managed to convert the turbines of its Douglas DC-8 to Stage 3, in the workshops it had in Miami. Meanwhile, the owners of Fine Air company (Frank and Barry Fine) bought Arrow Air and started these two joint operations. At the same time, Arrow began leasing planes to ATC for operations in the high seasons. In this way, with the collaboration of ATC, Arrow was able to maintain their current permit in Colombia.

Given the impossibility of negotiating with the Colombian Civil Aeronautics the problem of noise levels to convert the Douglas DC-8 turbines to Stage 3, Carlos Child withdrew the operating license to the airline in mid-1999, which forced the company to suspend operations definitively and went into liquidation immediately. The Douglas DC-8 HK-3816-X was scrapped in Miami in August 2000 and the Douglas DC-8 N507DC was returned to Fine Air company, the original owner. The ATC operation was replaced by Arrow Air. Fine Air company went bankrupt in 2002 and was sold by banks.

Facilities
The ATC facilities in Miami consisted of X-ray equipment, cold room and security personnel to receive the perishable cargo and warehouse for the receipt and palletizing of the merchandise. In Bogotá, an agreement was established with Aerosucre to use the cargo terminal at the airport, but with personnel hired directly by the airline. Sometimes special flights were made to Lima and Valencia.

Fleet
ATC had formerly consisted the following aircraft:

3 Douglas DC-8-51F
1 Douglas DC-8-61F

See also
 Miami International Airport
 List of airlines of Colombia
 List of defunct airlines of Colombia

References

External links

Airlines
Defunct airlines of Colombia
Airlines established in 1992
Airlines disestablished in 2003